Pennsylvania Route 286 (PA 286) is a , east–west state highway located in Allegheny, Westmoreland, Indiana, and Clearfield counties in Pennsylvania.  The western terminus is at U.S. Route 22 (US 22) in Monroeville.  The eastern terminus is at US 219 near Burnside.

Route description

PA 286 goes by many names along its route.  The names it goes by includes Golden Mile Highway, Saltsburg Road, Washington Street, Salt Street, Main Street, Oakland Avenue, Philadelphia Street, and Franklin Street.  Though signed east–west, the route takes a more northeast-southwest direction, especially in Indiana and Clearfield counties.

Allegheny County
The route starts at an interchange at US 22 in a rural portion of the Municipality of Monroeville and continues into Plum Borough.  The route spends only a little over four miles in Allegheny County before crossing the Allegheny/Westmoreland county line.

Westmoreland County
The route continues north before turning east at the intersection of PA 380, where the two routes exchange the Golden Mile Highway and Saltsburg Road in the town of Murrysville.  The route continues east in Westmoreland County, where it overpasses PA 66 in the village of Mamont (accessible by Pfeffer Road southbound or Mamont Road).  It then intersects PA 819 in Bell Township, and PA 380 in the village of Wakena, where it terminates.  The route then has a short concurrency with PA 981 before crossing the Kiskiminetas River and entering the town of Saltsburg, Indiana County, after spending about 15.5 miles in Westmoreland County.

Indiana County

The route starts going northeast after exiting the town of Saltsburg, before entering the borough of Indiana, the route has an intersection with PA 217 outside the village of Jacksonville, where it terminates, an interchange with US 422/PA 56, and an intersection with US 422 Business, both just outside Indiana.  The route enters the borough from the southwest, and has a short concurrency with PA 954 in downtown.  After passing under US 119, the route continues northeast.  After a short concurrency with PA 403 in Clymer, and an intersection with PA 240 in the village of Commodore, the route continues northeast, passing through Glen Campbell It then crosses the Clearfield county line after spending about 50 miles in Indiana County.

Clearfield County
The route continues northeast for a short distance before terminating at an intersection with US 219 in Burnside Township

History
Some of the route before its designation in 1961 included PA 13 from Saltsburg to Indiana, and PA 80 from PA 380 to US 219 and US 22 to PA 380.  Since its establishment, the route has stayed on the same roads.

Major intersections

PA 286 Truck

Pennsylvania Route 286 Truck is a  truck route in Indiana County, Pennsylvania.  The route starts at the interchange of PA 286 on US 422/PA 56.  After a short distance, the route heads north on US 119.  The route eventually goes west, and eventually meets up again with PA 286 just east of Indiana.

See also

References

External links

Pennsylvania Highways: PA 286

286
Transportation in Allegheny County, Pennsylvania
Transportation in Westmoreland County, Pennsylvania
Transportation in Indiana County, Pennsylvania
Transportation in Clearfield County, Pennsylvania